Ben Tomlinson (born 31 October 1989) is an English professional footballer who plays as a striker for Worksop Town

Career
Tomlinson was born in Dinnington, South Yorkshire. He came through the youth setup of Nottinghamshire-based club Worksop Town, and originally played for the under-19s before making it into the first team for the Tigers. He signed for Football League Two side Macclesfield Town on 29 June 2011 for an undisclosed five figure sum. He made his professional debut on 6 August 2011, in the opening day defeat to Dagenham & Redbridge at Moss Rose. Tomlinson scored his first league goals at Hereford United, scoring twice in the last five minutes after coming on as a late substitute. On 13 September he scored o–ne of the fastest goals in Football League history, scoring in just 6.4 seconds straight from kick off against then League Two leaders Morecambe.

On 8 August 2012 Tomlinson joined Conference Premier side Alfreton Town on a two-year contract for an undisclosed fee. In July 2013, less than a year after moving to Alfreton, he joined fellow Conference side Lincoln City on a two-year contract for an undisclosed four-figure fee.

After two years at Lincoln, Tomlinson joined Barnet in May 2015, on a two-year deal.

On 17 September 2015, Tomlinson joined National League side Grimsby Town on a one-month loan. After seven appearances, he returned to Barnet and then joined Tranmere Rovers on loan on 29 October 2015. Tomlinson left Barnet by mutual consent on 31 January 2017, having made only 12 appearances in one-and-a-half seasons at the club.

Tomlinson joined Carlisle United on a non-contract basis in March 2017. He then signed for F.C. Halifax Town on a one-year deal on 18 July 2017. He signed a new one-year contract with Halifax in June 2018. He went on to play 56 games in all competitions for the Shaymen, scoring four goals.

Tomlinson re-joined Alfreton for the 2019–20 season.

In October 2020, Tomlinson joined Frickley Athletic on loan to cover for injuries to their forwards.

On 17 November 2020, he returned to Northern Premier League Division One east side Worksop Town after nine years away.

Career statistics

References

External links

Ben Tomlinson profile at Lincoln City F.C.
Ben Tomlinson profile at Alfreton Town F.C.

1989 births
Living people
People from Dinnington, South Yorkshire
English footballers
Association football forwards
Worksop Town F.C. players
Macclesfield Town F.C. players
Alfreton Town F.C. players
Lincoln City F.C. players
Barnet F.C. players
Grimsby Town F.C. players
Tranmere Rovers F.C. players
Barrow A.F.C. players
Carlisle United F.C. players
FC Halifax Town players
Frickley Athletic F.C. players
English Football League players
National League (English football) players
Northern Premier League players
Sportspeople from Yorkshire